Muhammad Khan Achakzai (—) is a Pakistani politician who served as the 23rd Governor of Balochistan.

Family
He is son of the Abdul Samad Achakzai and the elder brother of politicians Mahmood Khan Achakzai and Hamid Khan Achakzai.  He graduated from University of the Punjab, University of Strathclyde, and Harvard Kennedy School.

Political career
He is affiliated with the Pakhtunkhwa Milli Awami Party and hails from the prominent Achakzai political family of Balochistan. Achakzai was appointed as Governor of Balochistan on 11 June 2013. He resigned from governorship on 6 September 2018.

References

Living people
Muhammad
Governors of Balochistan, Pakistan
Pashtunkhwa Milli Awami Party politicians
Pashtun people
People from Killa Abdullah District
People from Quetta
University of the Punjab alumni
Alumni of the University of Strathclyde
Year of birth missing (living people)
Harvard Kennedy School alumni